Phillip Nickolas Katsabanis (born June 17, 1995), better known by his stage name Stitches, is an American rapper. Prior to adopting the name Stitches, he was known as Lil Phill. He released his first mixtape, No Snitching Is My Statement, in 2014, followed by a debut album in 2015, titled For Drug Dealers Only.

Personal life 
Katsabanis was born on June 17, 1995, in Miami, Florida, to Esther and Alexander Katsabanis, who divorced when Katsabanis was one year old. Of Greek and Cuban descent, Katsabanis grew up in Kendall, Florida, a suburb of Miami. The rapper said he began selling cocaine and guns to support himself after moving to South Beach, Florida, from Miami.

Katsabanis was married from 2012 to 2017, and has three children.

In August 2022, Katsabanis was arrested on cocaine and weapons charges.

Discography

Studio albums 
For Drug Dealers Only (2015)
Tales of a Drug Lord (2016)
Cocaine Holiday (2017)
I Need Rehab (2017) 
Bipolar (2018)
Time for Murder (2018)
Married to the Bricks (2020)

Mixtapes 
No Snitching Is My Statement (2014)
Brick Bible (2015)
Supply and Demand (2015)
Brick Bible 2 (2019)

References

1995 births
American people of Greek descent
American people of Cuban descent
American hip hop musicians
Rappers from Miami
Living people
21st-century American rappers
Southern hip hop musicians
Horrorcore artists